"Watch Me" (also known as Watch Me (Whip/Nae Nae)) is the debut single by American rapper Silentó. In March 2015, he was signed to Capitol Records, which released the track as a single with an accompanying music video. The song peaked at number three on the Billboard Hot 100, where it spent six non-consecutive weeks. With a viral clip on YouTube, the song was popular for its dance despite negative reviews, a combination of two popular moves cited in the title: the "Whip" and the "Nae Nae" as well as other hip hop dances from various songs, such as "Crank That (Soulja Boy)" and "Stanky Legg". As of 2022, it remains his most well known song.

Release 
The song was released on May 5, 2015. Starting August 28 until September 6, 2015, Silentó performed a remixed version for Nickelodeon to help advertise their Labor Day weekend line-up of shows (SpongeBob SquarePants, ALVINNN!!! and the Chipmunks, Harvey Beaks, Sanjay and Craig, and Pig Goat Banana Cricket) under the title "Epic Dance Party". In the promos, portions of Silentó's original music video are used, although there are new shots featuring him dancing with the Nick characters and rapping the remix.

Music video
The music video was uploaded online on Silentó's Vevo channel on YouTube on June 25, 2015, and shot in Atlanta, Georgia. It was directed by Marc Klasfeld. Set in a high school gymnasium, Silentó performs the dance moves mentioned in the song with dance crews, high school, and university cheerleaders, fans, even a trio of conservative women who later join in on the dance, and also incorporates videos sent in by viewers. Lil Scrappy and Rich White Ladies make guest appearances in the video.  As of July 2020, it has surpassed 1.7 billion views on YouTube, making it one of the site's 80 most viewed videos.

The video was listed as Vevo's second most watched video of all time.

DanceOn campaign
The digital media company DanceOn was crucial to the success of "Watch Me (Whip/Nae Nae)." After striking a deal with Silentó, DanceOn reached out to its network of dance content creators to make instructional videos to the song for their #WatchMeDanceOn campaign. 50 of their creators made videos that they then posted on YouTube. Instantly they gained popularity bringing in more than 250 million views in under three months.  The campaign was launched on April 13, 2015, and by May 22, 2015, the track's sales tripled from 17,000 units a week to 42,000 a week.

Reception

Commercial
"Watch Me (Whip/Nae Nae)" peaked at number three on the Billboard Hot 100, where it has spent six non-consecutive weeks being kept from number one on the chart by songs such as "Cheerleader" by Omi and "Can't Feel My Face" by The Weeknd. It spent eighteen weeks in the top ten of that chart before dropping out on October 14, 2015. Internationally, the song has peaked within the top ten of the charts in Australia, as well as the top twenty of the charts in Denmark, New Zealand and the United Kingdom.  The song reached over 2 million in sales by November 2015, and has sold 2,440,000 copies as of June 2016.

Critical
The song received mixed to negative reviews. Elliot Wilson listed it #2 on his list of 15 worst singles. Complex called it "One of the most annoying things to ever exist", and listed it among their "Songs We Hated in 2015".

It received a nomination for Song of the Summer at the 2015 MTV Video Music Awards and another nomination for R&B/Hip-Hop Song at the Teen Choice Awards.

In other media 
The song is featured in the television shows South Park, The $100,000 Pyramid, and The Unbreakable Kimmy Schmidt. It can also be heard in the film The Emoji Movie and the first teaser trailer for Trolls. The track appears in the video game Just Dance 2017, and is playable in the demo for Xbox One, PlayStation 4, and Nintendo Switch; Wii U copies of the demo keep Justin Bieber's "Sorry" as the playable demo track.

Covers and adaptations
In 2015, The Australian group The Janoskians released a parody of the song titled "We Don't (Whip/Nae Nae)".

Charts and certifications

Weekly charts

Year-end charts

Decade-end charts

All-time charts

Certifications

References

2015 debut singles
Capitol Records singles
2015 songs
Songs about dancing
Novelty and fad dances
Music videos directed by Marc Klasfeld
Snap songs
Hip hop dance
Viral videos
Internet memes introduced in 2015